The 1967 Hawaii Rainbows football team represented the University of Hawaiʻi at Mānoa as an independent during the 1967 NCAA College Division football season. In their first season under head coach Don King, the Rainbows compiled a 6–4 record.

Schedule

References

Hawaii
Hawaii Rainbow Warriors football seasons
Hawaii Rainbows football